Andrine Sæther (born 7 September 1964) is a Norwegian actress.

She had her début at the National Theatre in 1995, and has worked there since. Here she has acted in roles such as "Varja" in Chekhov's The Cherry Orchard, and "Bolette" in Ibsen's The Lady from the Sea. In 1997 she had her début as a movie actress, in a small role in the film Livredd. The same year she acted in the popular Budbringeren, a role for which she received an Amanda nomination. She has also acted in several made-for-TV productions, such as Blind gudinne (1997) and Berlinerpoplene (2007).

In 2005 Sæther married singer and songwriter Lars Lillo-Stenberg, known from the band deLillos. When the celebrity magazine Se og Hør published pictures from the ceremony without permission, the two sued the magazine for invasion of privacy. They lost the lawsuit, but Sæther and Lillo-Stenberg have declared their intentions to pursue the case in the European Court of Human Rights in Strasbourg.

Select filmography

References

External links
 Biography from Nationaltheateret.
 List of roles at Nationaltheateret.

1964 births
Living people
Norwegian stage actresses
Norwegian film actresses
Norwegian television actresses